Events in the year 1936 in Norway.

Incumbents
 Monarch – Haakon VII
 Prime Minister – Johan Nygaardsvold (Labour Party)

Events

 13 September – A major rockfall hit the lake Loenvatnet in Sogn og Fjordane, creating a  flood wave that destroyed several farms, killing 74 people. The second such incident in 31 years, the disaster caused the permanent depopulation of the area.
 Norsk Hydro opens its Herøya plant for the production of artificial fertilizer.
 The 1936 Parliamentary election takes place. This was the last Norwegian parliamentary election held before World War II and the German invasion of Norway.
 Leon Trotsky was in Norway until September 1936

Popular culture

Sports

 Ivar Ballangrud was olympic and world champion of speed skating.

Music

Film

Literature
 The Knut Hamsund novel Ringen sluttet (The Ring is Closed), was published.

Notable births

2 January – Kjell Opseth, politician (d. 2017)
13 January – Jan Brøgger, professor of social anthropology and clinical psychologist (died 2006)
23 January – Jon Østeng Hov, photographer and writer (died 2019)
26 January – Tom Vraalsen, politician and ambassador
31 January – Nils Aaness, speed skater
4 February – Ole Johs. Brunæs, politician
8 February – Francis Sejersted, history professor (d. 2015)
28 February – Ole-Jørgen Nilsen, actor and theatre director (died 2008)
5 March – Lars Roar Langslet, politician (d. 2016)
12 April – Øystein Lønn, writer (died 2022).
14 April – Astrid Nøklebye Heiberg, politician and professor of medicine
15 April – Gunnar Aasland, judge
21 April – Unni-Lise Jonsmoen, illustrator and children's writer.
25 April – Einar Olsen, newspaper editor
3 May – Narve Bjørgo, historian and professor
3 May – Inger Pedersen, politician
11 May – Nils O. Golten, politician (died 1999)
22 May – Hans Olav Tungesvik, politician (d. 2017)
27 May – Eli Skolmen Ryg, television producer
28 May – Ole Klemet Sara, politician (d. 2013)
8 June – Karin Hafstad, politician
9 June – Per Brandtzæg, physician (d. 2016)
3 July – Baard Owe, actor (d. 2017)
8 July – John Herstad, historian
14 July – Egil Børre Johnsen, writer
18 July – Sigbjørn Larsen, politician
24 July – Finn Kristensen, politician
29 July – Rolf Presthus, politician (died 1988)
28 August – Asbjørn Liland, politician
1 August – Asbjørn Larsen, industrial leader.
14 September – Harry Danielsen, politician (d. 2011)
17 September – Rolv Wesenlund, comedian, singer, musician, writer and actor (died 2013)
24 September – Ingvard Sverdrup, politician (died 1997)
28 September – Anne Borg, ballet dancer and choreographer (d. 2016).
1 October – Toralf Engan, ski jumper
4 October – Bjarne Mørk Eidem, politician
6 October – Gunnar Mathisen, politician (died 2022).
25 October – Arnfinn Nesset, nurse and serial killer
14 November – Sven O. Høiby, journalist (died 2007)
17 November – Richard Edvardsen, politician
23 November – Bjørn Hernæs, politician
29 November – Målfrid Grude Flekkøy, psychologist (died 2013)
29 November – Torild Skard, psychologist, feminist and politician
29 November – Reidun Brusletten, politician
10 December – Thor Helland, long-distance runner
14 December – Arve Tellefsen, violinist
30 December – Fredrik Skagen, writer (d. 2017)

Notable deaths
17 February – Ole Nikolai Ingebrigtsen Strømme, politician and Minister (born 1876)
25 February – Arthur Amundsen, gymnast and Olympic silver medallist (born 1886)
27 March – Christian Hansen Wollnick, newspaper editor, jurist and politician (born 1867)
19 June – Ole Georg Gjøsteen, educator and politician (born 1854)
10 July – Abraham Berge, politician and Minister (born 1851)
12 July – Kittel Halvorson, a U.S. Representative from Minnesota (born 1846)
30 November – Johan Turi, first Sami author to publish work (born 1854)
6 December Anthon B. Nilsen, businessman, politician and author (born 1855)
25 December – Ole Østervold, sailor and Olympic gold medallist (born 1872)
27 December – Karl Bull, military officer, politician and Minister (born 1860)

Full date unknown
Olav Bjørkum, politician (born 1859)

See also

References

External links